Mexicana Universal Durango is a pageant in Durango, Mexico, that selects that state's representative for the national Nuestra Belleza México pageant.

In 2000 was not sent to a State Representative.

The State Organization hasn't had a national winner in Nuestra Belleza México/Mexicana Universal.

Titleholders
Below are the names of the annual titleholders of Nuestra Belleza Durango 1994-2016, Mexicana Universal Durango 2017, and their final placements in the Mexicana Universal.

 Competed in Miss Universe.
 Competed in Miss International.
 Competed in Miss Charm International.
 Competed in Miss Continente Americano.
 Competed in Reina Hispanoamericana.
 Competed in Miss Orb International.
 Competed in Nuestra Latinoamericana Universal.

Designated Contestants
As of 2000, isn't uncommon for some States to have more than one delegate competing simultaneously in the national pageant. The following Nuestra Belleza Durango contestants were invited to compete in Nuestra Belleza México.

External links
Official Website

Nuestra Belleza México